Mark Goodwin may refer to:

Mark Goodwin (footballer) (born 1960), English footballer
Mark Goodwin (musician) (born 1986), American drummer